Killingsworth is a surname. Notable people with the surname include:

Cleve Killingsworth, American health care chief executive
Edward Killingsworth (1917–2004), American architect
Jim Killingsworth (1923–2007), American basketball player and coach
JoAnn Dean Killingsworth (1923–2015), American actress, dancer and figure skater